The following lists the top 25 singles of 2014  in Australia from the Australian Recording Industry Association (ARIA) end-of-year singles chart.

Pharrell Williams had the highest selling single in Australia in 2014 with "Happy".

See also
List of number-one singles of 2014 (Australia)
List of Australian chart achievements and milestones

References

Australian record charts
2014 in Australian music
Australia Top 25 Singles